Stanley Joseph (born 24 October 1991) is a French athlete specialising in the pole vault. He represented his country at the 2016 Summer Olympics without qualifying for the final.

His personal bests in the event are 5.75 metres outdoors (Angers 2016) and 5.64 metres indoors (Jablonec nad Nisou 2016).

International competitions

References

1991 births
Living people
French male pole vaulters
Athletes (track and field) at the 2016 Summer Olympics
Olympic athletes of France
Sportspeople from Orléans